was a private university in Hamamatsu City, Shizuoka Prefecture, Japan.

It added a Department of International Economics in 1994, and a graduate studies program in 1996. In 1998, it changed its name to "Hamamatsu University". It closed in 2016.

External links
 Official website 

Educational institutions established in 1988
Universities and colleges in Shizuoka Prefecture
Buildings and structures in Hamamatsu
Defunct private universities and colleges in Japan
1988 establishments in Japan
Educational institutions disestablished in 2016
2016 disestablishments in Japan